All Else Failed is the debut album by metalcore band Zao. The album was later re-recorded and released as the identically titled All Else Failed in 2003.

This album on Steadfast Records has had three pressings in total, with different cover art for each pressing:
1st press: 1996 (green artwork)
2nd press: 1999 (brown artwork)
3rd press: 2000 (black artwork)

The album was again re-released in 2018, through Steadfast Records, with new artwork and was remixed and remastered.

Critical Reception
While not many reviews of their debut album were published, a select few are available.

Jesusfreakhideout.com's Steven Powless published a review of the album, giving it 2.5 stars out of 5. Despite his low-hung review, Powless states "Moreover, heart, I think, is really the driving force behind All Else Failed; it's the engine that makes it go. The raw emotion bleeding through every track rivals Where Blood and Fire Bring Rest in its intensity and makes this musically-somewhat-subpar effort much more satisfying than it could have been without it."

Track listing

Credits
Zao
Shawn Jonas - Vocals
Roy Goudy - Guitar
Mic Cox - Bass
Jesse Smith - Drums

Production
 Myk Porter - Producer
 Barry Poynter - Producer
 Ben Schigel - Engineer, Mixing, Mastering
 Keith Konya - Design, Layout
 Matt Traxler - Executive Producer, Photography
 Steve Wayne - Photography
 Danielle - Photography

References

Zao (American band) albums
1995 debut albums
Tooth & Nail Records albums